Sunrise Mall is a single-level regional shopping mall located at the intersection of Sunrise Boulevard and Greenback Lane in Citrus Heights, California, United States in the Sacramento metropolitan area. It is one of the area’s largest and most successful enclosed super regional shopping centers. The mall is the centerpiece of the Sunrise MarketPlace shopping district in Citrus Heights. Sunrise Mall is accessible from I-80 or Highway 50 from most locations in the greater Sacramento area. The anchor stores are 2 Macy's stores and JCPenney. There is 1 vacant anchor store that was once Sears.

History
Sunrise Mall was constructed in 1971 by The Hahn Company and was originally anchored by J. C. Penney, Liberty House, Sears, and Weinstock's. Liberty House shuttered operations in 1984 and a Macy's (the current Women's store, which serves as their main store) opened in its place shortly thereafter, moving some of its operations from Birdcage Walk (now the Marketplace at Birdcage), a competing shopping center across Sunrise Boulevard. In 1996, Weinstock's was converted into a second Macy's (the current Men's & Home store), moving the rest of its operations from Birdcage. In 1999, Sunrise Mall underwent an extensive interior renovation for the first time, and in 2007, a 500-seat food court with a fireplace was added in the corridor between J. C. Penney and Macy's Men's & Home. In 2015, Sears Holdings spun off 235 of its properties, including the Sears at Sunrise Mall, into Seritage Growth Properties. In November 2015, Spinoso Real Estate Group acquired the mall from Steadfast Companies. On April 17, 2018, it was announced that Sears would be closing as part of a plan to close 24 stores nationwide. The store closed in July 2018. The mall was purchased by Namdar Realty Group on December 20, 2018.

World TeamTennis

The World TeamTennis returned to Sunrise Mall July 8 for the first home match of the 2011 season. Sunrise Mall had lost this asset in 2007, when the Sacramento Capitals moved to nearby Westfield Galleria at Roseville. Many fans have followed the Capitals as they’ve moved from the Sunrise Mall to Roseville’s Galleria and back. The team was very involved in the community and gave over a million dollars back to the community throughout the time they were in Sacramento.

The 2011 team included world class players Mardy Fish, Vania King, Mark Knowles, Dusan Vemic, Christina Fusano, Nick Monroe and Sacramento’s own Yasmin Schnack. Wayne Bryan coached the team. In previous years, the WTT had guest players such as Andre Agassi and Anna Kournikova appear in Sacramento. In 2011, Serena Williams played against the Sacramento Capitals in front of a sold-out crowd.

2011 marked the 26th year that the Sacramento Capitals were part of WTT. Along with the growth of tennis all around the country, fan support grew over the years. Nine teams made up the 2011 WTT Pro League season, sponsored by GEICO. The short season ran from July 4 to July 24.

WTT did a lot to keep fans in the game including soliciting support by giving away Capitals merchandise, Sunrise Mall gift cards and other fun prizes. T-shirts and other items were thrown into the audience during breaks.

In addition, vendors were set up to sell food, drinks and tennis merchandise for the event. Activities and play areas for kids were set up and a live band played beforehand and performed the national anthem. DJ music was even played over the PA system, getting some fans to dance in the stands.

The Sunrise MarketPlace, Sunrise Mall and the Capitals enjoyed a wonderful partnership that brought six WTT championships to Sacramento.

On February 4, 2014, the Capitals, after 28 seasons in Sacramento, announced their move to Las Vegas. The team was renamed the Las Vegas Neon.  The new Las Vegas team was shut down a few weeks later, before it even started after owner Deepal Wannakuwatte was arrested for running a Ponzi scheme.

On February 23, 2015, WTT announced that a new ownership group had taken control of the Texas Wild and moved the team to Sunrise Mall, renaming it the California Dream.

References

External links

Sunrise MarketPlace
Justice for Victims - Restitution Ordered in Decade-Long Ponzi Scheme (FBI)

Citrus Heights, California
Shopping malls established in 1972
Shopping malls in Sacramento County, California
World TeamTennis stadiums
1972 establishments in California
Buildings and structures completed in 1971
Namdar Realty Group